Clarence Earl Peaks (September 23, 1935 – March 31, 2007) was a professional American football fullback in the National Football League for the Philadelphia Eagles and the Pittsburgh Steelers.  He played college football at Michigan State University and was drafted in the first round (seventh overall) of the 1957 NFL Draft.

Over his 9-year NFL career (7 with Philadelphia), he ran for 3,660 yards and 21 TD. He also had 190 catches for 1,793 yards.

References

1935 births
2007 deaths
American football fullbacks
Michigan State Spartans football players
Philadelphia Eagles players
Pittsburgh Steelers players
Players of American football from Flint, Michigan